Echten is a village in the Dutch province of Drenthe and is part of the De Wolden municipality. The havezate Huis te Echten is located in the village.

History 
It was first mentioned in 1181 as "in villa Echtene". Huis te Echten was a havezate owned by the  family who were in possession of the area, and oversaw the excavation the peat. A havezate was a requirement to be admitted to the Knights of Drenthe. The estate is surrounded by a double moat. It has been modified and restored many times during its history. The oldest parts of the estate are from the late 15th century. It is currently in use for the blind and visually handicapped.

In 1840, Echten was home to 210 people. In 1953, an air watchtower was constructed in the forest near Echten to spot enemy planes flying under the radar. The tower was in operation until 1964. A sod house has been reconstructed in the village as a reminder of the past conditions. Het Echtens Paradijs (The Paradise of Echten) is a  nature area near the village.

Gallery

References 

Populated places in Drenthe
De Wolden